Tornatellinops is a genus of minute air-breathing land snails, terrestrial gastropod mollusk, or micromollusks in the family Achatinellidae.

Distribution
This genus is endemic to islands of the South Pacific.

Species
Species within the genus Tornatellinops include:
 Tornatellinops inconspicua (Brazier, 1872)
 Tornatellinops iredalei (Pilsbry & Cooke, 1915)
 Tornatellinops jacksonensis (Cox, 1864)
 Tornatellinops lidgbirdensis (Iredale, 1944)
 Tornatellinops mastersi (Brazier, 1876)
 Tornatellinops moluccana Boettger, 1891
 Tornatellinops moohuensis (Preston, 1913)
 Tornatellinops nepeanensis (Preston, 1913)
 Tornatellinops norfolkensis (Preston, 1913)
 Tornatellinops novoseelandica (Pfeiffer, 1853)
 Tornatellinops ponapensis
 Tornatellinops pressus Iredale, 1940

References

 Powell A. W. B., New Zealand Mollusca, William Collins Publishers Ltd, Auckland, New Zealand 1979 
 
 NZ Molluscan Checklist
 OBIS